Ludwig is an unincorporated community in Jefferson County, in the U.S. state of Missouri. The community was named for an individual identified as "Mr. Ludwig," who produced lime in the area.

References

Unincorporated communities in Jefferson County, Missouri
Unincorporated communities in Missouri